Tevfikiye can refer to:

 Tevfikiye, Alaca
 Tevfikiye, Çanakkale
 Tevfikiye, İpsala